Jafarabad (also Romanized as Ja‘farābād) is a village in Siyah Mansur Rural District, in the Central District of Bijar County, Kurdistan Province, Iran. At the 2006 census, its population was 698, in 165 families. The village is populated by Kurds with an Azerbaijani minority.

References 

Towns and villages in Bijar County
Kurdish settlements in Kurdistan Province